Lagameshwar is a village in the Belagavi district in the southwest state of Karnataka, India.

References

Villages in Belagavi district